The Naualko (Nhaawuparlku) were an indigenous Australian people of New South Wales.

Name
The name Naualko derives from their word for 'yes'(naua/nawa (so written by Norman Tindale). The word is now reconstructed as nhaawu, and thus their endonym means 'the people who utter nhaawu when they say 'yes.'

Language
The Naualko language, which was spoken in the Wilcannia area, became extinct very early on as colonization began. Luise Hercus and others now consider that it is probably related more to Kurnu than to Paakantyi. It has recently been argued, though no certainty attaches to the hypothesis, that the language of the Milpulo was a dialect of Naualko.

Country
The Naulko moved over their tribal terrain's , in the far western sector of New South Wales, from Dunlop to Murtee on the upper Darling River. They were also around the lower Paroo River north to Lake Tongo.

People
It has been suggested that the Naualko might be classified as a northern branch of the Paakantyi. Norman Tindale, taking into consideration the distinctive word for 'yes' in their ethnonym, argues that the probabilities lie with their being an independent tribe. In addition, early settlers like Frederic Bonney, familiar with the area's tribes, treated them as a discrete group.

Alternative names
 Bungyarlee
 Nawalko
 Ngunnhalgu
 Ngunnhlgri (This is a misprint)
 Nhaawuparlku
 Unelgo
 Wampandi  (meaning 'I do not understand')
 Wampangee, Wompungee, Wombungee

Notes

Citations

Sources

Aboriginal peoples of New South Wales